Minnesota State Highway 308 (MN 308) is a short  highway in northwest Minnesota, which runs from its intersection with State Highway 11 in Ross Township (near the unincorporated community of Fox); and continues northbound for 1.3 mile to its northern terminus at its intersection with State Highway 89 in Ross Township. Highway 89 continues north to the Canada–United States border.

Route description
Highway 308 is the short west leg of a "Y" joining Highway 11 to Highway 89 northbound.  The roadway follows 320th Avenue for 1.3 mile in Roseau County.

The route is legally defined as Route 308 in the Minnesota Statutes.

History
Highway 308 was authorized .  The route follows a short part of the former alignment of State Highway 89, north of State Highway 11; until a shortcut was constructed for Highway 89, west of the city of Roseau.

The route was paved when it was marked.

Major intersections

References

External links

Highway 308 at the Unofficial Minnesota Highways Page

308
Transportation in Roseau County, Minnesota